The timeline of Jorhat lists the important historical dates for the town of Jorhat in Assam.

Timeline

1700-1800

1800-1900

1900-2000

2000-present

History of Assam
Jorhat
Histories of cities in India
Jorhat